Inchoative aspect (abbreviated  or ) is a grammatical aspect, referring to the beginning of a state. It can be found in conservative Indo-European languages such as Latin and Lithuanian, and also in Finnic languages or European derived languages with high percentage of Latin-based words like Esperanto. It should not be confused with the prospective, which denotes actions that are about to start. The English language can approximate the inchoative aspect through the verbs "to become" or "to get" combined with an adjective.

Since inchoative is a grammatical aspect and not a tense, it can be combined with tenses to form past inchoative, frequentative past inchoative and future inchoative, all used in Lithuanian. In Russian, inchoatives are regularly derived from unidirectional imperfective verbs of motion by adding the prefix по- po-, e.g.  bezhát&apos;,  pobezhát&apos;: "to run", "to start running". Also compare  shli (normal past tense plural of  idtí, "to go") with  Poshlí! meaning approximately "Let's get going!". Certain other verbs can be marked for the inchoative aspect with the prefix за- za- (e.g.  on zasmejálsja, "he started laughing",  on zaplákal "he started crying"). Similar behavior is observed in Ukrainian, and in other Slavic languages. In Esperanto, any verb is made inchoative by the prefix ek-, e.g. , : "to dance", "to start dancing".

The term inchoative verb is used by generative grammarians to refer to a class of verbs that reflect a change of state; e. g., "John aged" or "The fog cleared". This usage bears little or no relationship to the aspectual usage described above.

References

Grammatical aspects
Latin grammar
Russian grammar
Ukrainian grammar